Madison High School may refer to:

 Madison County High School (Alabama), Gurley, Alabama
 Madison High School (Idaho), Rexburg, Idaho
 Madison Consolidated High School, Madison, Indiana
 Madison High School (Kansas), Madison, Kansas
 Kentucky:
Madison High School (Richmond, Kentucky), closed in 1989
Madison Southern High School, Berea, Kentucky
Madison Central High School (Kentucky), Richmond, Kentucky
 Madison High School (Michigan), Madison Heights, Michigan
 Madison Central High School (Mississippi), Madison, Mississippi
 Madison High School (Nebraska), Madison, Nebraska
 Madison High School (New Jersey), Madison, New Jersey
 Madison High School (North Carolina), Marshall, North Carolina
 Ohio:
Groveport Madison High School, Groveport, Ohio
Madison-Plains High School, London, Ohio
Madison High School (Madison, Ohio)
Madison Comprehensive High School, Mansfield, Ohio
Madison High School (Middletown, Ohio)
 Madison High School (Oregon), Portland, Oregon
 Madison Academic Magnet High School, Jackson, Tennessee
 Madison High School (Houston), Texas
 Madison County High School (Virginia)

See also
 James Madison High School (disambiguation)